Synergy University (Russian: Университет Синергия) or Moscow University for Industry and Finance "Synergy" (Russian: Московский финансово-промышленный университет «Синергия») is one of the largest universities in Russia with more than 65,000 students, more than 100 regional units & wide international representation in London, New York, Berlin, and Dubai.
Synergy University is an institution for higher education aimed at combining traditional academic teaching with fundamental knowledge & practical orientation.

The university is licensed by The Federal Education and Science Supervision Agency (Ministry of Education and Science of the Russian Federation). Its MA & MBA programs are internationally accredited by the Association of MBA's (AMBA, UK).

The university has offices in London, New York,  and Dubai.  The university sponsors a proprietary Business Incubator as well as manages a dedicated Venture Capital Fund "Synergy Innovations" promoting young entrepreneurial minds and technologies.

It runs an in-house TV channel “Synergy TV” while maintaining an internal publishing house "Synergy Press".

History 

The history of Synergy University goes back to 1995 when "The Moscow International Institute of Econometrics, Informatics, Finance, and Law" was established in Moscow.

Shortly thereafter, the institute was renamed into "Moscow Academy for Industry and Finance".

Since 2001, the master's programs at the university's business school have been accredited by Association of MBAs, the entire accreditation was completed six times, and the actual certificate was received in 2016.

In 2009 and under the leadership of Dr. Vadim Lobov and Prof. Yury Rubin, a strategic merger between the academy and "Synergy Business School", (an institute offering academic and training programs targeting skilled mid to top-level managers since 1988), took place to form Russia's largest private education provider. The newly formed institution is run under the brand name "Synergy University".

In 2019 Synergy University organized the Synergy Global Forum which gathered 26,000 participants and broke its own record. The headliner of the event was the famous actor Arnold Schwarzenegger.

Today Synergy University is Russia's largest private university with more than 35,000 students and over 40 regional and international branches and rep-offices across the globe.

Degrees 
"Bachelor's" and "master's" degree are recognized by not only Russian employers. These degrees are included in the international classification and understood abroad.  Training of bachelor's and master's in Synergy University is delivered through the full-time, part-time and distance learning programs.  Currently all programs are accredited by the Russian Federal Service for Supervision in Education and Science.

 BBA in Design
 BA in Advertising and PR
 BSc in Finance and Credit
 BBA in Banks and Banking
 BBA in Commerce
 BBA in Sport Management
 Bachelor of Civil Law
 BSc IT Infrastructure Engineering
 BBA in E-commerce
 BBA in Human Resource Management
 BSc in International Economics
 BSc in International Finance
 BBA in IT Projects Management
 BBA in Hotel and Restaurant Management
 BBA in Project Management
 BBA Sports Marketing
 BA in Journalism and Public Relations
 BSc in IT and Systems

List of MA degrees 
 Master of Science in Strategic Management
 Master of Science in Hotel and Restaurant Management
 Master of Science in Organizational Psychology
 Master of Science in Sports Management
 Master of Science in Banking
 Master of Science in Finance
 Master of Science in IT Management
 Master of Civil Law
 Master of Criminal Law
 Master of Arts in Design
 Master of Arts in Advertising and PR
 Master in computer science

Modes of Delivery 
Synergy University offers a wide range of educational provision.

Traditional (full-time) mode of delivery 

in-class learning is delivered 5 times a week in the form of lectures, seminars and colloquiums; there is an opportunity to get the final mark in subject on the basis of the ongoing monitoring of progress without sitting for any exam (test). Advanced learning of foreign languages offers an opportunity for practical training organization;, 
interning in partner companies of Synergy University as early as in the third year of study.

Evening and week-end mode of delivery 

in-class learning is delivered twice a week in the evening on weekdays or once a week on weekends in the form of lectures and seminars;
the opportunity of combining study with work in the chosen area;
self-study of subjects with the use of modern electronic educational technologies on the basis of MegaCampus web-portal, participation in virtual seminars and practical studies;
practical training and internships in partner companies of the university.

Dubai Campus 
Synergy University is offering programs through its newly established Dubai branch.

The Dubai branch of Synergy University is located in Jumeirah Lakes Towers (JLT) – one of the business and residential areas of Dubai in Platinum Tower, Cluster I.
 
For its 2014 intake Synergy University Dubai is offering several programs such as bachelor's degree in Global Economy, Hotel and Restaurant Management, Information Technologies and Systems and Masters in Hotel and Restaurant Management, Masters in Global Economy, Masters in Retail Management, MBA Women's Leadership and Executive MBA Leadership and Strategy. Programs are licensed by the local authority of Dubai – KHDA

References
 
KHDA website
Official university website in English
Official university Dubai campus website in English
Official university website in Russian
aMBA accreditation

Universities and colleges in Moscow
Universities and colleges in Dubai
1995 establishments in Russia
Educational institutions established in 1995